The following list includes notable people who were born or have lived in Lewiston, Maine.

Authors and academics 

 Alice Mary Baldwin, historian and educator
 Thomas A. Desjardin, historian of the American Civil War
 Edward C. Hayes, sociologist, and president of the American Sociological Association
 Douglas Hodgkin, political scientist and historian
 Bernard Lown, pioneering cardiologist credited with inventing the defibrillator; Nobel Peace Prize recipient

Business 

 Benjamin E. Bates, industrialist, founder of the Bates Mills and benefactor of Bates College
 Edward Burgess Butler, businessman and founder of Butler Brothers department stores
 Yvon Chouinard, rock climber and founder of Patagonia
 Orland Smith, railroad executive and soldier

Media and arts 

 Erin Andrews, television sports reporter, Dancing with the Stars co-host
 Tom Caron, sportscaster
 Ernie Coombs C.M., children's television entertainer and Order of Canada recipient
 Patrick Dempsey, actor, star of television series Grey's Anatomy
 Jim Flynn, songwriter, born in Lewiston
 Marsden Hartley, modernist painter
 Ray LaMontagne, folk singer and songwriter
 Cynthia McFadden, newscaster
 Rene Rancourt, singer
 Anne Taintor, artist, born in Lewiston
 Michael "Mudcat" Ward, blues bassist, pianist and songwriter, born in Lewiston
 Clarence White, guitar player and member of the rock group The Byrds
 Frances Turgeon Wiggin, composed Maine state song
 JoAnn Willette, actress, star of television series Just the Ten of Us

Military, politics and law 

 Georgette Berube, state legislator
 Romeo T. Boisvert, mayor and state legislator
 Louis J. Brann, 56th Governor of Maine during the Great Depression
 T.F. Callahan, state legislator, businessperson and Maine State Auditor
 Margaret Craven, state senator
 Nelson Dingley, Jr., U.S. congressman, and chairman of the House Ways and Means Committee
 Linda Smith Dyer, American lawyer, lobbyist, women's rights activist, co-founder of the Maine Women's Lobby
 William P. Frye, U.S. congressman and senator; President pro tempore of the United States Senate
 Louis-Philippe Gagné, Mayor of Lewiston
 Alonzo Garcelon, 36th Governor of Maine
 Paul LePage, 74th Governor of Maine
 Nate Libby, state legislator
 James B. Longley, 69th Governor of Maine
 James B. Longley, Jr., U.S. congressman
 Susan Longley, state senator
 Daniel J. McGillicuddy, U.S. congressman
 Garrett Mason, state senator
 Gina Mason, state representative
 John Michael, state legislator
 Frederick G. Payne, U.S. senator and the 60th Governor of Maine
 Paul N. Poirier, member of the Vermont House of Representatives and Barre City Council
 Peter T. Snowe, Maine state legislator
 Edward Parsons Tobie, Jr., American Civil War soldier and winner of the U.S. Medal of Honor
 Jared Golden, U.S. congressman

Sports 

 Bill Carrigan, manager of the Boston Red Sox and two-time World Series winner
 Walter Case, Jr., champion harness racing driver 
 Tom Downey, infielder for the Cincinnati Reds, Philadelphia Phillies, Chicago Cubs, and Buffalo Buffeds/Blues
 Joey Gamache, boxer and World Lightweight Champion
 Christy Gardner, member of United States women's ice sledge hockey team
 Larry Gowell, pitcher for New York Yankees who singled in his only MLB at-bat
 Rene Rancourt, who would regularly sing at the US National Anthem, and if applicable, the Canadian National Anthem at NHL games for the Boston Bruins
 Walter Thornton, outfielder and pitcher for the Chicago Colts/Orphans

References

Lewiston
Lewiston, Maine